Mission Park may refer to:

Locations 
 Mission Park station, a lstop on the Massachusetts Bay Transportation Authority (MBTA) green line in Boston, Massachusetts, USA
 Mission Park, Santa Barbara (otherwise known as Mission Historical Park), a public park in Santa Barbara, California, USA

Media and entertainment  
 Mission Park (film), a 2013 drama by Bryan Ramirez

See also
 Old Mission State Park, Idaho, USA
 Mission Raceway Park, Mission, BC, Canada